Graham Moore may refer to:

Graham Moore (Royal Navy officer) (1764–1843), Royal Navy admiral
Graham Moore Bay, an Arctic waterway in Qikiqtaaluk Region, Nunavut, Canada
Cape Graham Moore, an uninhabited headland on Bylot Island in the Qikiqtaaluk Region of Nunavut, Canada
Sir Graham Moore Islands (Nunavut), in the Canadian Arctic
Sir Graham Moore Islands (Western Australia)
Sir Graham Moore Island (Western Australia)
Graham Moore (footballer) (1941–2016), Welsh football player
Graham Moore (scientist) (born 1958), British biologist
Graham Moore (writer) (born 1981), American screenwriter and novelist

See also
 Graham (disambiguation)
 Moore (disambiguation)
 Sir Graham Moore Islands (disambiguation)